This is a list of notable events in Latin music (i.e., music from the Spanish- and Portuguese-speaking areas Latin America, Latin Europe, and the United States) that took place in 2000.

Events 
January 25 – The Recording Industry Association of America (RIAA) announces the creation of the "Los Premios de Oro y Platino" ("The Gold and Platinum Awards" in Spanish) for Latin albums (defined by the RIAA as a release with 51% or more in Spanish). Initially the thresholds for awards are 100,000 units for Disco de Oro, 200,000 units for Disc de Platino, and 400,000 or more for Multi-platino. Charlie Zaa, Luis Fonsi, Frankie Negrón, Los Hermanos Rosario, Gisselle, Jaci Velasquez, A.B. Quintanilla and Los Kumbia Kings, José Luis Rodríguez, Victor Manuelle, Jerry Rivera, and Grupo Mania are the first musicians to receive the RIAA Latin certifications.
September 13 – The inaugural Latin Grammy Awards are held at the Staples Center in Los Angeles, California:
"Corazón Espinado" by Santana featuring Maná wins the Latin Grammy Award for Record of the Year
Amarte Es un Placer by Luis Miguel wins the Latin Grammy Award for Album of the Year
"Dímelo" by Marc Anthony wins the Latin Grammy Award for Song of the Year
Ibrahim Ferrer wins the Latin Grammy Award for Best New Artist.
Cuban-American songwriter and producer Emilio Estefan is honored as the Person of the Year

Bands formed

Bands reformed

Bands disbanded

Bands on hiatus

Number-ones albums and singles by country 
List of number-one albums of 2000 (Spain)
List of number-one singles of 2000 (Spain)
List of number-one Billboard Top Latin Albums of 2000
List of number-one Billboard Hot Latin Tracks of 2000

Awards 
2000 Latin Grammy Awards
2000 Premio Lo Nuestro
2000 Billboard Latin Music Awards
2000 Tejano Music Awards

Albums released

First quarter

January

February

March

Second quarter

April

May

June

Third quarter

July

August

September

Fourth quarter

October

November

December

Unknown

Best-selling records

Best-selling albums
The following is a list of the top 10 best-selling Latin albums in the United States in 2000, according to Billboard.

Best-performing songs
The following is a list of the top 10 best-performing Latin songs in the United States in 2000, according to Billboard.

Births 
January 27Blessd, Colombian reggaeton singer
February 12María Becerra, Argentine reggaeton singer
April 12Manuel Turizo, Colombian reggaeton singer
April 13Khea, Argentine trap rapper
August 25Nicki Nicole, Argentine rapper
October 4Lunay, Puerto Rican reggaeton singer

Deaths 
May 24 – Rodrigo, 27, Argentine singer of cuarteto music
May 31 – Tito Puente, 77, American timbales musician, songwriter, record producer, and performer of mambo and Latin jazz music
July 23 – , Spanish pop singer (Vainica Doble)
October 6 – Cuco Sánchez, 79, Mexican singer and songwriter ("Fallaste Corazón", "Siempre Hace Frío")
October 15 – , Argentine bolero singer
November 19 – , Mexican singer of boleros and cumbia music
December 12 – Libertad Lamarque, 92, Argentine actress and singer

References 

 
Latin music by year